The 1951–52 UCLA Bruins men's basketball team represented the University of California, Los Angeles during the 1951–52 NCAA men's basketball season and were members of the Pacific Coast Conference. The Bruins were led by fourth year head coach John Wooden. They finished the regular season with a record of 19–12 and won the PCC Southern Division with a record of 8–4.

Previous season

The Bruins finished the regular season with a record of 19–10 and tied for the southern division championship with a record of 9–4. The Bruins lost to the Washington Huskies in the conference play-offs.

Roster

Schedule

|-
!colspan=9 style=|Regular Season

|-
!colspan=9 style=|Conference Championship

|-
!colspan=12 style="background:#;"| NCAA tournament

Source

Rankings

References

UCLA Bruins men's basketball seasons
Ucla
UCLA
UCLA Bruins Basketball
UCLA Bruins Basketball